Gynacantha nigeriensis is a species of dragonfly in the family Aeshnidae. It is found in Cameroon, the Republic of the Congo, Ethiopia, Ghana, Guinea, Nigeria, Sierra Leone, Uganda, Zambia, and possibly Tanzania. Its natural habitats are subtropical or tropical moist lowland forests and shrub-dominated wetlands.

References

Aeshnidae
Insects described in 1956
Taxonomy articles created by Polbot